Corowa was an electoral district of the Legislative Assembly of the Australian state of New South Wales, taking its name from town of Corowa on the Murray River.

History
The district was created in the 1904 re-distribution of electorates following the 1903 New South Wales referendum, which required the number of members of the Legislative Assembly to be reduced from 125 to 90. It consisted of parts of Albury, The Murray and the abolished seat of The Hume. It moved west in 1913, absorbing the eastern part of the abolished district of Deniliquin and losing its eastern part to the districts of Albury and Wagga Wagga.

In 1920, with the introduction of proportional representation, Corowa, Albury and Wagga Wagga were absorbed into Murray and elected four members. At the end of proportional representation in 1927, Corowa was recreated ran through until 1950 until it was abolished.

Members for Corowa

Election results

References

Corowa
Corowa
1904 establishments in Australia
Corowa
1920 disestablishments in Australia
Corowa
1927 establishments in Australia
Corowa
1950 disestablishments in Australia